Whom God Forgives is a 1957 Spanish action film directed by José María Forqué. At the 7th Berlin International Film Festival it won the Silver Bear Extraordinary Prize of the Jury award.

Plot 
Set in Andalusia in the 19th century, it reflects the persecution of some people with blood crimes that they have committed due to forced circumstances. Juan Cuenca, a miner, who has killed the foreman of the mine and his friend, an engineer who, for defending him, has killed the head of the mine. All of them live as refugees in the Andalusian mountains, persecuted by the Civil Guard, and intend to embark for America. 

The film reflects the tradition of freeing a prisoner during Holy Week in Malaga because of the image of Jesús el Rico.

Cast
 Francisco Rabal - Juan Cuenca
 Luis Peña - Andrés
 Alberto Farnese - Pedro
 Isabel de Pomés - Rosario
 Luisella Boni
 José Marco Davó - (as Marco Davo)
 José Sepúlveda
 Barta Barry
 Josefina Serratosa
 Santiago Rivero
 Ricardo Canales
 Antonio Puga
 Valeriano Andrés
 Rafael Calvo Revilla
 Alfonso Muñoz
 Salvador Soler Marí
 Casimiro Hurtado
 Adela Carboné

References

External links

1957 films
Spanish action films
1950s Spanish-language films
Films directed by José María Forqué
1950s Spanish films